Forash is a leguminous winter crop often featured in Sylheti cuisine. It is a kind of French bean. As a vegetable, it is similar to beans. Raw Forash is cooked as a vegetable, though the main part is its seeds. Forash is usually cooked with fish and meat. It is served with cooked rice and Roti. For the Sylhetis who live abroad, especially in the United Kingdom, the United States and the Middle East, Forash is dried in the sun and sent in packets to them.

history  
The climate of the Greater Sylhet region is dry in winter and the soil is moist, so Forash has been cultivated in Sylhet since ancient times. It first came to Sylhet from France. This is why it is called Forash in Sylheti language. This vegetable is grown well in the alluvium soil of Sylhet. This winter vegetable has also been growing in Chittagong and Comilla in recent years. Because of its popularity among the worldwide Sylhetis, it is exported to several countries including England, America and Canada.

Ingredients 
Vegetable oil, cinnamon, cardamom, salt, onions, chilli powder, turmeric, ground coriander and garam masala.

Procedure 
Before cooking Forash should be soaked 4-5 hours. Then it should be removed from the shell. Then it should be washed and drained. At the beginning, oil needed to be heated in a pan. Adding a little salt, onion is fried with chilli, cardamom and cinnamon. Then ginger and garlic is added if needed. When the onion turns yellow, half a cup of water is required. When the bubbles come out, turmeric and chilli powder should be poured. Then the seed of Forash can be added. It is needed to mix well and keep on medium heat for a few minutes. At that time, one and a half cups of water can be poured. Placing a lid on the pan, it needs some more time on medium heat. Finally the coriander leaves can be spread on the dish.

References

Sylheti cuisine
Curry dishes